Produced by the Bureau of Labor Statistics (BLS) in the US Department of Labor, the National Compensation Survey (NCS) provides comprehensive measures of occupational earnings; compensation cost trends, benefit incidence, and detailed plan provisions. It is used to adjust the federal wage schedule for all federal employees.  Detailed occupational earnings are available for metropolitan and non-metropolitan areas, broad geographic regions, and on a national basis. The index component of the NCS (Employment Cost Index) measures changes in labor costs. Average hourly employer cost for employee compensation is presented in the Employer Costs for Employee Compensation.

Data
The information used to produce these publications is provided by companies, organizations, and government agencies voluntarily reporting wage and benefit incidence and cost information.  All data provided to the BLS is strictly confidential and is used for statistical purposes only in accordance with Confidential Information Protection and Statistical Efficiency Act of 2002 (Title 5 of Public Law 107-347).

Collection
This data is collected by Field Economists within the BLS who contact firms selected at random through a statistical sampling process.  Field Economists then statistically sample between 1 & 8 occupations, depending on the size of the firm, and track the wages of all incumbents in these occupations over a set period of time.  Select respondents also report benefit data including provisions, participation, and costs.  Occupations are benchmarked using a 4-factor leveling system developed by the BLS to assist in comparing compensation data across industries, professions, and geographic boundaries.

Publications/Statistics
 Employment Cost Index
 Employer Costs for Employee Compensation
 Employee Benefits in Private Industry
 Occupational Pay Relatives

External links
 National Compensation Survey

Labour economics indices
Reports of the Bureau of Labor Statistics
Workers' compensation